The 1994 Haringey Council election took place on 5 May 1994 to elect members of Haringey London Borough Council in London, England. The whole council was up for election and the Labour party stayed in overall control of the council.

Background

Election result

|}

Ward results

Alexandra

Christakis Zissimos was a sitting councillor for Harringay ward.

Archway

Bowes Park

Bruce Grove

Coleraine

Crouch End

Fortis Green

Caroline Elderfield was a sitting councillor for Crouch End ward.

Green Lanes

Harringay

High Cross

David Coats was a sitting councillor for Alexandra ward.

Highgate

Hornsey Central

Hornsey Vale

Muswell Hill

Noel Park

Park

Seven Sisters

South Hornsey

Harris was a sitting councillor for the Muswell Hill ward.

South Tottenham

Tottenham Central

Bob Harris was a sitting councillor for High Cross ward.

West Green

White Hart Lane

Woodside

References

1994
1994 London Borough council elections